Green Meadow may refer to:

"The Green Meadow", a short story by H. P. Lovecraft and Winifred V. Jackson

Towns
Green Meadow, Delaware, US
Green Meadow, Florida, US
Green Meadow Township, Minnesota, US

Structures
Green Meadow Waldorf School, Chestnut Ridge, New York, US
Green Meadow (Odessa, Delaware), US, a historic house